The 1996 French Grand Prix was a Formula One motor race held on 30 June 1996 at Circuit de Nevers, Magny-Cours, France. It was the ninth race of the 1996 Formula One season. Michael Schumacher qualified in pole position but his engine blew on the warm-up lap and he did not start the race. The 72-lap race was won by Damon Hill for the Williams team, from a second position start. Jacques Villeneuve finished second in the other Williams, with local driver Jean Alesi third for the Benetton team.

This was the last Grand Prix where a Forti car started the race as they would fail to qualify for the remaining Grand Prix they would enter, however both cars were forced to retire.

Classification

Qualifying

Race

Notes 

Jacques Villeneuve crashed heavily at Estoril corner in qualifying, when the front end of his Williams went wide and smashed the left side of his car in the barriers. The car was repaired in time for race day.
Eddie Irvine had qualified 10th, but had all his qualifying times deleted and was demoted to the back of the grid after one of the air deflectors on his Ferrari was found to be too tall.
Pole-sitter Michael Schumacher had an engine failure during the formation lap and was unable to start the race.
This was the last Grand Prix start for Andrea Montermini.
Renault engines had their best result with a 1-2-3-4 by Hill, Villeneuve, Alesi and Berger, equalling Honda's achievement at the 1987 British Grand Prix.

Championship standings after the race

Drivers' Championship standings

Constructors' Championship standings

 Note: Only the top five positions are included for both sets of standings.

References

French Grand Prix
Grand Prix
French Grand Prix
French Grand Prix